Audioslave is the debut studio album by American rock supergroup Audioslave, released on November 18, 2002, through Epic Records and Interscope Records. In the United States, it has been certified triple platinum by the Recording Industry Association of America. The album spawned the singles "Cochise", "Like a Stone", "Show Me How to Live", "I Am the Highway", and "What You Are"; "Like a Stone" was nominated for Best Hard Rock Performance at the 46th Grammy Awards.

Background and release

After Zack de la Rocha left Rage Against the Machine, the remaining members of the band began to look for a new vocalist. Producer and friend Rick Rubin suggested they contact Chris Cornell and played them the Soundgarden song "Slaves & Bulldozers" to showcase his ability. Cornell was in the process of writing material for a second solo album when Tom Morello, Tim Commerford, and Brad Wilk approached him, but he decided to shelve that and pursue the opportunity to work with them. 

Speaking about the first time Cornell jammed with the band, Morello said: "He stepped to the microphone and sang the song and I couldn't believe it. It didn't just sound good. It didn't sound great. It sounded transcendent. And ... when there is an irreplaceable chemistry from the first moment, you can't deny it." The new quartet wrote 21 songs during 19 days of rehearsal and started recording their first album in late May 2001.

On March 19, 2002, the band announced they would be part of the 7th Ozzfest tour that summer, but three days later Cornell quit the group, and the Ozzfest dates were canceled. He rejoined the band six weeks later, after some management issues were resolved.

Rough versions of thirteen songs from the album were leaked onto various peer-to-peer file sharing networks on May 17, 2002, six months before the official release of the album, under the name "Civilian" (or "The Civilian Project"). In an interview with Metal Sludge that July, Morello blamed "some jackass intern at Bad Animal Studios in Seattle" for stealing some demos and putting them on the internet without the band's permission. Later, he said that "It was very frustrating, especially with a band like this, there is a certain amount of expectation. For some people the initial time that they are hearing it was not in the form that you would have them hear it. In some cases they weren't even the same lyrics, guitar solos, performances of any kind."

Cornell was having problems with alcohol while making the album, and in late 2002 there was a rumor that he had checked himself into drug rehabilitation—a rumor that was confirmed when he conducted an interview with Metal Hammer from a clinic payphone. He later said that he went through "a horrible personal crisis" during the making of the first Audioslave album, staying in rehab for two months and separating from his wife. He remained sober until shortly before his passing in 2017.

The album was released on November 18, 2002, in the United Kingdom and a day later in the United States. The band toured through 2003, before taking a break from the road in 2004 to record their second album.

Artwork
The album cover was designed by Storm Thorgerson (with Peter Curzon and Rupert Truman), who, as leader of the group of artists known as Hipgnosis, was best known for his cover work for Pink Floyd. About it, he said: "We knew we were going to set this idea of the eternal flame, the graphic flame, in Lanzarote, a volcanic island, since volcanoes suited the brooding menace of Audioslave." 

Thorgerson also said that an unreleased version of the cover featuring a naked man looking at the flame was shot elsewhere at the same location, and "We so nearly used it, but we were not entirely sure of the nude figure."

Reception

Critical

Audioslave received mixed reviews from critics. Some critics lambasted the group's efforts as uninspired and predictable. 

Pitchforks reviewers Chris Dahlen and Ryan Schreiber praised Cornell's voice, but criticized virtually every other aspect of the album, calling it "the worst kind of studio rock album, rigorously controlled -- even undercut -- by studio gimmickry". They described Cornell's lyrics as "complete gibberish" and called producer Rick Rubin's work "a synthesized rock-like product that emits no heat". 

Jon Monks from Stylus Magazine also considered Rubin's production over-polished and wrote that, "lacking individuality, distinction and imagination this album is over-produced, overlong and over-indulgent". On the other hand, other critics praised the supergroup's style as reminiscent of 1970s heavy metal and compared it to Led Zeppelin and Black Sabbath, saying Audioslave add a much-needed sound and style to contemporary mainstream rock music and have the potential to become one of the best rock bands of the 21st century.

In 2005, Audioslave was ranked number 281 in Rock Hard magazine's book of The 500 Greatest Rock & Metal Albums of All Time.

Commercial
The album entered the Billboard 200 chart at position number seven, after selling 162,000 copies in its first week. It was certified gold by the RIAA less than a month after its release, and by 2006 had achieved triple-platinum status. 

It is the most successful Audioslave album to date, having sold more than three million copies in the United States alone. The singles "Cochise", "Like a Stone", "Show Me How to Live", and "I Am the Highway" all reached the top ten of Billboard'''s Modern Rock Tracks chart, with "Like a Stone" reaching number one, and those four, plus "What You Are", reached the top ten of the Mainstream Rock chart, with "Like a Stone" again reaching the top spot.

Track listing

DualDisc version
The album was included among a group of 15 DualDisc releases that were test-marketed in two cities: Boston and Seattle. The DualDisc has the standard album on one side and bonus material on the other side. The DVD side of the Audioslave'' DualDisc featured the entire album in higher resolution 48kHz sound, as well as some videos. The higher resolution DVD side of this disc has been called a demonstration-quality audiophile release.

ConnecteD bonus track
For a limited time, the CD could be inserted into a CD-ROM drive and used to access the ConnecteD website. Here, the user was able to download bonus videos, interviews, photos, and a bonus track ("Give").

Personnel
Audioslave
Chris Cornell – vocals
Tim Commerford – bass, backing vocals
Brad Wilk – drums
Tom Morello – guitars

Production and design

 Produced by Rick Rubin; Co-Produced by Audioslave
 Mixed by Rich Costey
 Recorded by David Schiffman and Andrew Scheps
 Additional Engineering by John Burton, Floyd Reitsma, Thom Russo, and Andrew Scheps; Assisted by Chris Holmes and Darron Mora
 Digital Editing by Greg Fidelman, Thom Russo, and Andrew Scheps
 Album Production Coordinator/Wrangler: Lindsay Chase
 Mastered by Vlado Meller, Assisted by Steve Kadison
 Album Cover by Storm Thorgerson and Peter Curzon
 Art Direction by Storm Thorgerson; Assisted by Dan Abbott and Finlay Cowan
 "Flame" Logo by Peter Curzon
 Photography by Rupert Truman
 Band Photos by Danny Clinch
 Sculpture Made by Hothouse

Charts

Weekly charts

Year-end charts

Decade-end charts

Certifications

References

2002 debut albums
Albums produced by Rick Rubin
Albums with cover art by Storm Thorgerson
Audioslave albums
Epic Records albums
Interscope Records albums
Albums produced by Chris Cornell